HD 15082 (also known as WASP-33) is a star located roughly 399 light years away in the northern constellation of Andromeda. The star is a Delta Scuti variable and a planetary transit variable.  A hot Jupiter type extrasolar planet, named WASP-33b or HD 15082b, orbits this star with an orbital period of 1.22 days. It is the first Delta Scuti variable known to host a planet.

Spectrum
HD 15082 is an Am star, which makes its stellar classification challenging to discern. The hydrogen lines and effective temperature of the star are similar to spectral type A8, however the calcium II K line resembles that of an A5 star, and the metallic lines are more similar to an F4 star. The spectral type is written kA5hA8mF4.

Pulsations
Delta Scuti variables usually exhibit many pulsation modes, and HD 15082 is no exception, with 8 measured high frequency p-modes. Another proposed non-radial mode, which could be induced by tidal interactions with the planet, would make this star also a Gamma Doradus variable. This star has the GCVS variable star designation V807 Andromedae.

Planetary system
In 2010, the SuperWASP project announced the discovery of an extrasolar planet, designated WASP-33b, orbiting the star. The discovery was made by detecting the transit of the planet as it passes in front of its star, an event which occurs every 1.22 days.

Notes

References

Andromeda (constellation)
015082
011397
A-type main-sequence stars
Delta Scuti variables
Andromedae, V807
Planetary systems with one confirmed planet
Planetary transit variables
Durchmusterung objects
33
J02265106+3733017V807